Mary Christmas is a 2002 American Christmas movie written by Stanley M. Brooks and Betty G. Birney. It was directed by and stars John Schneider. PAX TV (WPXP Channel 67) achieved its highest rated movie ever with the world premiere of "Mary Christmas" on November 29, 2002

Plot

Joel Wallace (Schneider), is a widower raising a daughter, Felice (Jenna Boyd). In her Christmas letter to Santa Claus, Felice wishes for a new mother for Christmas. The letter is intercepted by a local news producer who cancels reporter Mary Maloney's vacation and sends her to investigate the Wallace family as a human interest story. Most of the movie deals with Joel's searching for a new wife that will be Felice's mother. Felice is searching for a mother, and Mary Maloney's is wishing for her daughter to be happy, the baby that she gave up nine years earlier; the real Santa Claus poses as a governor who has both letter's to Santa, and grants all of their wishes; The real daughter and mother are reunited as the father is given his old ball mint he always loved!

See also 
 List of Christmas films

References

External links
 

2002 television films
2002 films
American Christmas films
Christmas television films